The men's 400 metres event at the 1999 All-Africa Games was held 14–16 September 1999 at the Johannesburg Stadium.

Medalists

Results

Heats
Qualification: First 3 of each heat (Q) and the next 4 fastest (q) qualified for the semifinals.

Semifinals
Qualification: First 3 of each semifinal (Q) and the nest 2 fastest (q) qualified for the final.

Final

References

400